Pratani Ramakrishna Goud, also known as R.K. Goud, is a well known Telugu film producer, director, screen play writer and distributor. He also acted in few movies like Jodi No 1.

He produced and directed several movies under his own banner R.K. Films namely Sardar Papanna, Jodi No 1, Swargamlo Ramanna. He also penned lyrics for the song 'Sirisilla' in the movie Mogudu Pellala Dongata.

Filmography

Director
 Sardar Papanna: with lead actors as Krishna (Telugu actor), Suman (actor), and Jaihind Goud.
Mogudu Pellala Dongata: starring Gurlin Chopra and Susanth.

Producer
 Jodi No 1: with lead actors as Uday Kiran, Venya ,Srija and Pratani Ramakrishna Goud.
 Prateekara Jwala: made in Hindi and Telugu languages with miss world Yukta Mukhi in lead role.
 Rowdygari Pellam: starring Sivajiraj directed by Sumit Roy.
Yuva Raktam: starring Vijay and Indraja directed by Janaki Sounder.

Distributor or Presenter
Bank: starring Jackie Shroff, Abbas and Rahul Dev directed by Arun Kumar.
Gaali Seenu: starring Mumaith Khan, Posani directed by Uday Bhaskar.
Swargamlo Ramanna: directed by Raj Kumar.
Allari Pellam: starring Sivajiraja and Subhasri directed by Shivaji.
Target: starring Mumaith Khan and Siva Balaji directed by Ramesh Raja.
Beats: starring Vinay and Pranathi directed by A.V.V. Naidu.
Malli Malli: starring Skanda and Kalyani directed by Raj Aditya.
Sunami: starring Ankita.
Miss Bharathi: directed by K. Ganeshan.
Dammunnodu: starring Rishi and Sowmya directed by B.V.V Choudry.

References

Telugu male actors
Living people
Telugu film directors
Telugu film producers
Year of birth missing (living people)